
Gmina Góra Kalwaria is an urban-rural gmina (administrative district) in Piaseczno County, Masovian Voivodeship, in east-central Poland.

Villages
Apart from the town of Góra Kalwaria, Gmina Góra Kalwaria contains the villages and settlements of Aleksandrów, Baniocha, Borki, Brześce, Brzumin, Buczynów, Cendrowice, Coniew, Czachówek, Czaplin, Czaplinek, Czarny Las, Czersk, Dębówka, Dobiesz, Julianów, Karolina, Kąty, Kępa Radwankowska, Królewski Las, Krzaki Czaplinkowskie, Linin, Łubna, Ługówka, Mikówiec, Moczydłów, Obręb, Ostrówik, Pęcław, Podgóra, Podłęcze, Podosowa, Potycz, Sierzchów, Sobików, Solec, Szymanów, Tomice, Wincentów, Wojciechowice, Wólka Dworska and Wólka Załęska.

Neighbouring gminas
Gmina Góra Kalwaria is bordered by the gminas of Chynów, Karczew, Konstancin-Jeziorna, Piaseczno, Prażmów, Sobienie-Jeziory and Warka.

References
Polish official population figures 2006

Gora Kalwaria
Piaseczno County